The Pride may refer to:

 The Pride (The Isley Brothers song), 1977
 The Pride (Five Finger Death Punch song), 2012
 The Pride (album), a 2012 album by InMe
 The Pride of West Virginia, marching band of West Virginia University
 The Pride (play), 2008, by Alexi Kaye Campbell
 The Pride (comics), a fictional supervillain team appearing in American comic books published by Marvel Comics

See also
  Pride (disambiguation)